This is a list of Hindi films films that were released in 2022.

Box office collection
The highest-grossing Hindi films released in 2022, by worldwide box office gross revenue, are as follows.

January–March

April–June

July–September

October–December

See also
 List of Hindi films of 2023
 List of Hindi films of 2021

Notes

References 

2022
Hindi
2022 in Indian cinema